Tucker's Last Stand is a 1990 Blackford Oakes novel by William F. Buckley, Jr. It is the ninth of 11 novels in the series.

Plot
CIA agent Blackford Oakes is sent to Vietnam in 1964 to assist in cutting off supply lines to the Viet Cong.

References

1990 novels
Blackford Oakes novels
Novels set during the Vietnam War